Laroque-des-Arcs (Languedocien: La Ròca dels Arcs) is a former commune in the Lot department in south-western France. On 1 January 2017, it was merged into the new commune Bellefont-La Rauze.

See also
Communes of the Lot department

References

Laroquedesarcs